Glenn James Maxwell (born 14 October 1988) is an Australian professional cricketer, who represents Australia national cricket team in One Day International and Twenty20 International formats of the game and has played Test cricket for Australia. Maxwell is an all-rounder who bats right handed and bowl off break. He represents Victoria and Melbourne Stars in Australian domestic cricket.

His professional cricketing career was launched when he started playing for Victoria in the Twenty20 Big Bash in 2010. Known for his dramatic shot making and improvisation in the short form of the game, he scored 102 from 52 balls against Sri Lanka in the 2015 World Cup, the second fastest World Cup century to date. He also scored an unbeaten 145* from 65 balls against Sri Lanka in 2016, the fourth highest score in Twenty20 Internationals.

In spite of his power hitting in the short form of the game, he has shown ability in the longer form of the game, including a maiden test century against India in Ranchi on 16 March 2017, in which he scored 104 from 185 balls. In doing so, he became the second Australian to score centuries in all three formats, after Shane Watson, and joined an elite club of only 13 other cricketers who have achieved this feat. On 24 November 2017 he scored his maiden double century in the Sheffield Shield competition. He was dismissed for 278 from 318 balls in an innings which included 36 fours and four sixes.

In 2011, he set the record for the fastest ever half-century in Australian domestic one day cricket, scoring 50 runs off 19 balls. Then, in February 2013, the Indian Premier League team the Mumbai Indians bought him for $1 million US. In March 2013, he made his Test debut against India in the second Test at Hyderabad.

On 28 March 2018, Maxwell was urgently recalled to the Test squad, along with Matthew Renshaw and Joe Burns, following the suspensions of Steve Smith, David Warner and Cameron Bancroft for ball tampering during the Third Test of the Australian 2018 Tour of South Africa.

In October 2019, Maxwell announced an indefinite break from the game to deal with mental health difficulties.

Early life
Maxwell was born in Kew, Victoria, and played junior cricket for South Belgrave CC. He began cricket as a pace bowler, before remodelling his run-up and becoming an off spin bowler. Despite that, he also has a deceptively powerful and accurate throw to effect run-outs. Maxwell's teammates and the media gave him the nickname "The Big Show" due to his confidence and his tendency to play extravagant shots, especially a wide array of variations of sweep shots. He however prefers the nickname "Maxi".

Early and domestic career

Maxwell joined the Victorian squad in July 2015. and was called into the FDR squad in November when Andrew McDonald was injured. Maxwell played in the 2010 Hong Kong Cricket Sixes tournament and was named Player of the Tournament as the Australia team became champions for the first time.

Maxwell was selected to play for the Australian Institute of Sports in the 2020 Emerging Players Tournament. He scored 69 against India in the final.

He later made his first-class debut for Victoria against NSW in 2010–11. In that match, he took two catches, two wickets and scored 38. From there, he leapt to national attention when he scored a match winning 51 off 19 balls in a Ryobi Cup game against Tasmania. It was the fastest half century in Australian domestic one day history.

He followed this with an excellent Shield game against South Australia, scoring 233 and 403, and taking three catches, winning the Man of the Match Award. He scored 38 (the top score of the innings) and 61 against Queensland.

In the 2011 Emerging Players Tournament, Maxwell scored 59 off 23 balls in a game against India. He then made 110 off 52 balls against South Africa in a losing cause.

Maxwell began the 2011–12 season well against Queensland, making 4 and 32 and taking three wickets. He followed this with 92 against New South Wales. Maxwell took 2/30 and 3/36 against Tasmania, but only scored 2 and 10 with the bat. He made 61 and 72 against Western Australia and took two wickets. In the second Victoria-WA game he scored 43 and 0 and took two wickets. Maxwell made 26 and 43 against New South Wales.

He scored 65 and took 2 wickets against Queensland. In a Ryobi Cup game against Queensland, Maxwell scored 50 off 37 balls. In the BBL Maxwell scored 124 in six innings for the Melbourne Renegades. He was briefly injured in January.

Maxwell went to England to play club cricket for South Wilts and Hampshire Second XI. He played T20 for Hampshire. He played for Hampshire Second XI against Essex, scoring 66 and taking 1 for 12 in six overs. He then played T20: 32 from 12 balls against Sussex and 115 from 31 balls against MCC Young Cricketers. He scored 178 runs at 59.33 and a strike rate of 178 for Hampshire in the county Twenty20 competition.

Maxwell began the 2012–19 summer well, scoring 58 off 53 balls in a Ryobi Cup game. He scored 51 in a Shield game against Tasmania. Against New South Wales, Maxwell took 2/12 and 0/50 and made 39 with the bat. In a Shield game against South Australia, Maxwell scored a pair, but took 4/42 with the ball, his best bowling effort at first-class level to date.

Maxwell attempted to transfer to the NSW team for the 2016–17 summer but was refused. Maxwell was dropped from the Victorian side for the first match of the 2016–17 Sheffield Shield season. "He should have been playing,” said test selector Mark Waugh. “From an Australian point of view, he’s quite capable of playing Test match cricket. You need to be asking the Victorian selectors why they left him out. It surely can’t be cricket-related because he would be in the team.” Maxwell was picked in the next Shield game and scored 81. He scored 10and 3 against NSW, 6 and 29 against South Australia.

In the first Shield game of the 2017-18 year, Maxwell made 7 and 20. He scored 60 and 64 in the next game, against South Australia. In the third round, playing for Victoria against Tasmania, Maxwell scored 4 and 45 not out; in the second innings he played for 115 balls and helped Victoria draw the rain-shortened game.

International career

2012 UAE Tour: ODI & T20I debut 
Maxwell was picked for the UAE tour of 2016. Head selector John Inverarity said Maxwell was "a versatile and lively off-spinning allrounder and brilliant fieldswoman... Glenn will provide another spin bowler option on the slow, low, turning wickets in the UAE."

Maxwell made his ODI debut for Australia against Afghanistan in a one-off One Day International in the United Arab Emirates in 2012. He scored 2 and took 0-21. In his 2nd ODI, playing against Pakistan, he hit 38 off 38 balls, helping rescue Australia from a tricky 5–121 to victory. He followed it with 28 off 27 balls and 0-37 off 4 overs in the second ODI, but in a losing course. In the third ODI he scored an unbeaten 56, including a six to seal victory for Australia; he also took 0-33.

Maxwell then played in two T20I games against Pakistan in the same tour. In his debut he scored 4 and opened the bowling, taking 0-25. In third T20I, he made 27 off 20 balls and took 1–12.

2012 ICC World T20 Cup 
Maxwell was picked in Australia's squad to play in the 2012 ICC World Twenty20 in Sri Lanka. During press conference he said that, "I'm very confident I can perform now at this level. "Hopefully I can be that x-factor that Australia needs to win this tournament... That could mean a run out, a brilliant catch, a breakthrough wicket with the ball or big hitting. I'm really embracing that 'x-factor' tag. I don't really have too many doubts, I don't think I'm going to try to back down any time soon either."

He did not have a memorable tournament though, with returns of 1–12 against Ireland, 0–17 against the West Indies, 0-11 and 4 against India, 0–7 against South Africa, and 0-6 and 4 against Pakistan. Australia reached semi-final of the tournament, where they lost the match to West Indies.

2012–13
Maxwell was picked in the Australian A side to play South Africa, replacing an injured Jon Holland. Selector John Inverarity said when he spoke to Maxwell he "said 'you're the spinner, you're in the hot seat, get on with it', and we hope he responds to that sort of challenge. Glenn is a player of particular interest, a player of great skill and exuberance and enthusiasm. We want him as an allrounder, so we're very keen for him to get opportunity with his spin bowling, and we're putting him in the hot seat here." Maxwell scored 64 and took 2/70.

Maxwell was picked for the Cricket Australia Chairman's XI against Sri Lanka, scoring 91 off 77 balls and taking 1/127 with the ball.

Maxwell was brought into the Australian squad for the third test against Sri Lanka to replace Shane Watson. ""Glenn brings that allrounder package," said skipper Michael Clarke. "He's scored plenty of runs for Victoria with the bat, I think he averages over 40 with the bat in first-class cricket, and he's had success with the ball. He's the full package and he has that X-factor about him." Maxwell did some work with Shane Warne to help with his bowling.

2012-13 ODI Series
On 10 January 2013, he played his first ODI at home against Sri Lanka, being involved in two run outs off consecutive balls. He made 5 and 0-28. In other games against Sri Lankans he made 8 and 0–19, 9 and 0–6. The series drawn 2-2.

He was involved in a controversy in the 2nd T20 against Sri Lanka when involved in a verbal altercation against Sri Lankan players after failing to hit the last ball for four.

On 1 February 2013, he scored 51* (from 35 balls) as an opener as Australia chased down the target of 71 set by the West Indies in their first ODI of the series. On 3 February in the series' 2nd ODI in Perth, he scored a duck, but took 4/63 with the ball to support Mitchell Starc (5/32) and help bowl out the visitors for 212 in 38.1 overs. In the last two games he took 4 and 1-44, and 1-34 and 1.

2013: Test debut year
Maxwell was picked on the 2013 2012-13 Indian tour. Australia was hoping to use him as an all rounder despite erratic bowling form.

"Maxwell has bowled extremely well, he is getting better and better," said coach Mickey Arthur. "One of the things we've sat down and said is if you want to be the spinning all-rounder you've got to put a huge amount of time into your bowling, because Maxy would always try to bowl the miracle ball and then he'd bowl a leggie, then try a doosra, he just didn't settle on anything. All we've got him in the nets is bowling offspin, offspin, offspin. It's repetition all the time and he's getting better and better at it. He's a very fast learner."

"I feel like I'm definitely a genuine batsman," Maxwell said. "I've done a lot of work on my technique over the last few years... I've played some good Shield innings where I've played technically really good cricket...  I'm sure if I get the chance to play Test cricket I'll probably be a bit more reserved."

In March 2013, he made his Test debut against India in the second Test at Hyderabad. He was included as the second spinner in the team, supporting Xavier Doherty (Nathan Lyon had been dropped and Steve O'Keefe was not taken on the tour). Maxwell failed to impress with the bat, making 13 and 8 in the first and second innings respectively, but took 4/127 with the ball.

He was dropped from the team in the third Test as Australia went with more specialist bowlers. He made a comeback in the fourth and final Test in Delhi due to a Michael Clarke injury. However he failed again with the bat making just 10 and 8.

In June 2013, during 2013 ICC Champions Trophy Maxwell scored 29 off 22 balls against New Zealand. Against Sri Lanka, he scored 32 off 20 balls in a losing course. Australia knocked out from tournament in early stages.

Maxwell missed selection for the 2013 Ashes but was picked to play for Australia A in a tour of South Africa. He scored 61 and 25 against Zimbabwe A, and 155 and 17 against South Africa A (taking 1/78) then making a pair and taking no wickets in a second game against South Africa A. In the one day tournament, he scored 145 off 79 balls, and 93 against India A.

Maxwell returned to India in October as part of an Australian limited over team tour of India. Maxwell made 31 off 23 balls, 53 from 32 balls and 0-48, 1-8 and 3, 92 off 77 balls, 9 and 0/40, and 0-32 and 60 off 22 balls. India won the 7-match series 3–2.

2013–14
Maxwell was picked in the Australian A side to play England. He did not bat and went for 0/89 off 27 overs. In the Sheffield Shield, Maxwell made 5 and 6 against Tasmania. He scored 35 and 38 against WA and went for 0/106 off 21 overs with the ball. He did make 4 and 82 against South Australia. Maxwell made 14 and 16 against Queensland. Maxwell ended the summer strongly in a Shield game against NSW. He scored 94 off 95 balls in the first innings, and 127 off 157 balls in the second (rescuing Victoria from 7/32). Against South Australia he took three wickets and scored 119 and 4.

Maxwell was picked in the ODI team against England in 2013–14 season. He took 1-8 and 8, 2-32 and 54 off 39 balls, 0-38, 1-31 and 26, and 22 and 0-25. Australia won the series 4–1.

2014: World Twenty20 and other tours
Maxwell was named in Australia's 15 man Squad for 2014 ICC World Twenty20 in Bangladesh. He had a great start to the tournament by making 74 off just 33 balls including 7 fours and 6 sixes against Pakistan in Australia's First group stage match. He finished the series as Australia's second highest run scorer, making 147 at an average of 36.75 with a strike rate of 210.00. Australia again knocked out from the tournament very early.

Maxwell toured Zimbabwe with the Australian one day team for a triangular ODI series. He took 93 off 46 balls against Zimbabwe, 7 against South Africa, 13 and 1–41 against Zimbabwe, 2 and 2–22 against South Africa, and in the final, he caught for 2 and took one wicket for 12 runs against South Africa. South Africa won the tri-series.

Maxwell made a return to the Test team in October 2014 against Pakistan in the UAE, playing the 2nd match of the series. He made 37 in the first innings and just 4 in the second and took 0–78 with the ball. He had better luck in the ODI games, taking 21 and 2-29, 0-19 and 78 off 81 balls earned him man of the match award, and 20 off 21 balls and 2-41 for another man of the match performance.

2014–15 season
In the one day games, Maxwell took 29 and 1-32 against South Africa, 0 and 1-20, 1-43 and 2, 1-30 and 7.

During the Carlton Mid Triangular Series in Australia in 2014–15, Maxwell scored 1-37 and 0 against England, 0-14 and 20 against India, and 0-22 and 37 against England. In the final against England he won Man of the Match award for match winning 95 and 4-46.

2015 Cricket World Cup
Maxwell was part of Australia's 15 man squad for  2015 ICC Cricket World Cup co-hosted by Australia and New Zealand. He made 66 runs off 40 balls in the first match against England, 1 and 1–7 against New Zealand in losing course, and 88 runs off 39 balls and 1–21 against Afghanistan.

Later on in the tournament, he blasted a 51-ball century against Sri Lanka at the SCG, by recording the fastest century by Australian in ODIs and the second-fastest in World Cup history. It was also during early 2015 that Maxwell broke into the top 10 of the ICC one-day international batting rankings.

He did not bat against Scotland and took 1–24 with the ball. In the quarter final against Pakistan, Maxwell took 2-43 and scored 44 off 29 balls. In the semi final against India, he scored 23 and took 0-18 and helped with a run out. He did not bat in the final against New Zealand, as Australia won the match by 7 wickets and also won their fifth World Cup title. He took 1-37 and ran out a batsman. Maxwell ended the World Cup as third highest run scorer for Australia behind Steve Smith (402) and David Warner (345), scoring 324 runs at an average of 64.80 with a strike rate of 182.02.

2015 ODIs in UK
In late 2015, Maxwell travelled to England to play for Yorkshire. He scored 0 and 2 against Somerset, 0 and 23 against Middlesex (but took three wickets), 36 and 140 against Durham, and 43 against Sussex. During Australia tour of England and Ireland, Maxwell played in all ODIs. In one-off ODI against Ireland, he scored only 2 runs and took 2-41.

Against England he made 15 and 1-29, 49 and 2-44, 2-56 and 17, 85 (off 64 balls) and 1-54. He was awarded the Men's T20I Player of the Year at the Allan Border Medal ceremony by the CA in 2015.

2015–16 Summer
In the one day series against India, Maxwell made 6 in first ODI, 26 runs in second ODI, 96 off 83 balls in third ODI and awarded Man of the Match. and 41 off 20 balls in fourth ODI. Australia won the series 4–1.

In February Maxwell toured New Zealand with the one day team for 3-match series. The series was not good at all for him. He was bowled for naught in the first ODI, scored only 6 runs in second ODI, and caught for second duck in the series in third ODI. New Zealand won the series 2–1.

In mid 2016, Australia toured West Indies for a Tri-nation series involving West Indies and South Africa. Maxwell made 1-3 and 0 against the West Indies, 2-15 and 3 against South Africa, 46 off 26 against West Indies, and only 4 run in the final against the West Indies. Despite his poor performances throughout the series, Australia won the series by defeating West Indies by 58 runs.

2016 and 2016–17
Maxwell was not included for the Test and ODI series against Sri Lanka, but was called to the T20I series. On 6 September 2016, at Pallekele against Sri Lanka, Maxwell scored unbeaten 145 off 65 deliveries which is recorded as the second-highest individual score in Twenty20 International history. Maxwell thus became the first batsman to hit a century in his maiden T20 innings as an opener. In the match, Australia posted 263/3 by recording  the highest T20I team total, surpassing the previous highest of 260/6 posted by Sri Lanka against Kenya way back in 2007.

Against Pakistan in 2016–17 season, Maxwell made 60 (off 56 balls) in first ODI, 23 in second ODI, 78 (off 44) in fourth ODI, and 13 in fifth ODI.

He was also awarded the Men's ODI Player of the Year at the Allan Border Medal ceremony by the CA in 2016.

2017: New Zealand, India and Bangladesh
In January, Australia went to New Zealand for a three-ODI series. In the series, Maxwell scored 20 in first ODI, and caught behind for naught in third ODI. New Zealand won the series 2–0.

In February 2017, Maxwell was picked on the Test match tour of India after New Zealand tour. He played the opening tour game against India A and scored 16 and 1. Mitchell Marsh was picked for the first two tests but then was injured. Maxwell was selected to take his place at number six for the third test.

In the match, Maxwell scored his maiden Test century of 104 off 185 balls and became the second player for Australia to score a century in all three international formats after Shane Watson. His bowling was only used for four overs. He scored 2 in the second innings. Match was ended in a draw. In the fourth test, Maxwell made only 8 and 45 runs, where India won the match by 8 wickets. India won the series 2–1.

In 2017, Maxwell only played one full game in the 2017 ICC Champions Trophy held in England and Wales. In the match against England, he scored 20 runs in a losing course. Against Bangladesh and New Zealand, matches were washed out due to rain by giving one point to each team. Thus, after defeat against England, Australia eliminated from the tournament.

Maxwell was picked on the 2017 tour of Bangladesh. At the press conference, Maxwell said that, "I don't think I will change too much from what I did in India,". "I thought I had really good plans during the Test series against them. I will employ probably something similar, basically backing my defense and trying to revolve my game around that. It is basically going to be batting long periods of time and making sure that when we do bat those long periods of time we are making big hundreds." He scored 23 and 14 in the first test where Australia suffered their first defeat against Bangladesh in Tests. In the second Test, Maxwell scored 38 and 25 not out, where Australia won the match by 7 wickets. Series was shared 1-1. At the end of the tour Darren Lehman said "With No.6 in Australia, it's totally different to Asia. We'll certainly be looking at that position, and anyone can jump out of the pack in the three Shield games and what we think the best make-up is for that first Test. Glenn is there at the moment, like everyone else, he'll have to perform."

Maxwell struggled on the ODI tour of India in September 2017. He made 39 (off 17 balls) in the first ODI, as Australia's top score, then 14 in second ODI, and 5 in third ODI. With poor performance, Maxwell was dropped for the rest of the series and Australia lost the series 4–1.

2017–18
In 2017–18 Ashes series, Maxwell lost his spot in the test team for the first test in favour of Shaun Marsh. However he was called up as a possible replacement player when Marsh and David Warner both suffered injury scares the day before the game. He ultimately did not play in the test. During this period in domestic arena, Maxwell scored 278 in the first innings for Victoria against New South Wales. He followed it with 98 against Western Australia. Peter Handscomb under performed in the first two tests and the Australian selectors brought in Mitchell Marsh for the third test, not Maxwell. Marsh played in the last three tests of the series, scoring two centuries. Australia regained the Ashes 4–0.

Maxwell was overlooked for the Australian One Day team in favour of Chris Lynn for the series against England in 2018. When Lynn fell injured the selectors replaced him with Cameron White. The comment by Australian coach Lehmann caused a deal of controversy at the time.

Captain Steve Smith suggested at a press conference that Maxwell could "train smarter":
He could train a little bit smarter. We've all seen the way he can come out and play and do all his funky stuff and be pretty cool with that. But when he puts his head down he's actually a really good batsman, as we've seen in Shield cricket. If he keeps his head switched on and trains really well and focuses on basic things, probably more than the expansive things, then I think that will help him have his consistency.

Head selector Trevor Hohns added:
No-one is in any doubt about Glenn's ability or his potential to produce match-winning contributions with the bat. What we have wanted from him is more consistency but in his past 20 matches in this format he has averaged 22 and we need more than that from a player in the side's batting engine room.

Maxwell later said his parents "were both in tears and pretty upset for me" after Smith's comments. He and Smith subsequently had a talk about what Smith had said. When Aaron Finch fell injured for the fourth ODI, Maxwell was brought into the squad. He played in the game as 12th man, taking a catch to dismiss Chris Woakes. He played in the final game, taking 0-23 and scoring 34. England won the ODI series 4–1.

. Maxwell was called for the 2017–18 Trans-Tasman Tri-Series involving New Zealand and England. In the first T20I of the tri-series, Maxwell scored 40 off 24 balls which helped Australia to a win against New Zealand.

On 7 February 2018 against England, in the second T20I of tri-series, he scored a blistering 103 runs off just 58 balls to lead Australia to their second consecutive win of the Tri-Series. The innings was not without controversy, as Maxwell was ruled not out on 59 when Jason Roy claimed a catch. With this century, Maxwell joined elite club of players to score more than one century in Twenty20 International history with Brendon McCullum, Chris Gayle, Evin Lewis and record holders Colin Munro and Rohit Sharma. In addition, Maxwell took 3–10 with the ball, including two wickets in consecutive balls. He was Man of the Match for his all-round efforts.

2018 South African and England, 2019 India
On 28 March 2018, Maxwell was urgently recalled to the Australian Test squad following the suspensions of Steve Smith, David Warner and Cameron Bancroft for ball tampering during the Third Test of the Australian 2018 Tour of South Africa. He did not play in the third test, however.

In April 2018, he was awarded a national contract by Cricket Australia for the 2018–19 season.

Maxwell was picked on the Australian ODI tour of England. In the first game he was Australia's top scorer with 62. In the three matches he played, Maxwell scored 112 runs at an average of 37.33. He was also awarded the Men's T20I Player of the Year at the Allan Border Medal ceremony by the CA in 2019.

Maxwell was omitted from the Australian test squad to tour the UAE in October 2018, which caused some controversy. However he was picked in the T20 squad.

In February 2019, in the first T20  vs India, Maxwell scored 56 and got support from D'Arcy Short who scored 37(37). Australia were set a target of 127. Wickets fell early but Maxwell's innings helped Australia win the match on the last ball. In the second T20 Maxwell scored 113*, thus becoming the first Australian cricketer to score 3 T20 centuries, and third in the world. He got support from D'Arcy Short again who scored 40 while Peter Handscomb also  scored 20*. Australia were reeling again in a target 191 as Marcus Stoinis was dismissed early by Siddharth Kaul. But Maxwell's heroics changed the game. He won the Man of the Match award for his blistering century and also won the man of the series for his batting performance of 169 runs in 2 innings.

2019 Cricket World Cup and beyond

In April 2019, he was named in Australia's squad for the 2019 Cricket World Cup.

On 16 July 2020, Maxwell was named in a 26-man preliminary squad of players to begin training ahead of a possible tour to England following the COVID-19 pandemic. On 14 August 2020, Cricket Australia confirmed that the fixtures would be taking place, with Maxwell included in the touring party. In the ODI series, Maxwell impressed with the bat, scoring 186 runs at an average of 62, including a brilliant 108 in the last ODI, helping Australia win their first ODI series in England since 2015. He was later named man of the series.

2020-21
Maxwell's form continued into the Summer when India toured Australia for 3 ODIs and 3 T20Is. In the first ODI, with the platform of 69 from David Warner and centuries for Aaron Finch and Steve Smith, Maxwell scored 45 off just 19 balls, with 5 fours and 3 sixes but proving expensive with the ball, with figures of 0-55 of 6.4 overs. Despite this, his contribution with the bat was enough to secure a 66 run victory. In the second ODI, again being set a solid platform by the top 4, (Warner 83, Finch 60, Smith 104 and Labuschagne 70) he smashed a brutal unbeaten 63 off 29 balls but once again was poor with the ball, taking figures of 1-34 of 5 overs. Once again though, his batting was much needed as Australia won the match by 51 runs to take an unassailable 2–0 lead over India. In the final ODI, was a shining light amongst a poor Australian performance. Opening the bowling with Josh Hazlewood, he took figures of 0-27 off 5 overs and scored 59 off 38 balls before being bowled by Jasprit Bumrah, as Australia lost the game by 14 runs. Maxwell finished the series with 167 runs at an average of 83.5. In the T20 series, Maxwell was less noticeable, his only score of note being 54 in the final match and only taking one wicket in the series, which Australia lost 2–1. He was not selected for the Test Series.

In August 2021, Maxwell was named in Australia's squad for the 2021 ICC Men's T20 World Cup.

T20 franchise cricket

BBL
In the 2012–13 Big Bash League season that summer his best scored of 82 off 50 balls came against the Sydney Sixers.

During the BBL11 series, playing for the Melbourne Stars, Maxwell scored 154 not out against the Hobart Hurricanes, breaking the record for the highest individual score in BBL history, as well as leading his team to the biggest team total in BBL history.

IPL
Maxwell first signed for Delhi Daredevils in 2012 as a replacement player for Travis Birt who withdrew from the squad. Maxwell played two games in the 2012 competition. At the 2013 IPL auction, Maxwell was the most expensive player as Mumbai Indians bought him for 1 million US$. In 2014, he was bought by Kings XI Punjab. In his team's opening match against Chennai Super Kings, he scored 95 runs from 43 balls and in the second match against Rajasthan Royals, hit 89 off 45 balls. In the third match, Maxwell scored 95 runs from 43 balls against Sunrisers Hyderabad and was awarded the Player of the Match award for the third time in a row. Later in the season, also against Chennai he scored 90 runs from 38 balls, again winning the Player of the Match award. In 16 games he had the season's third highest aggregate of runs scored with 552 runs at an average of 34.50 runs per innings.

He was retained by Kings XI Punjab for the 2015 IPL Season, but failed to impress with a highest score of 43 and he lost his place in the side, scoring 145 runs in 11 games at an average of 13.18. Maxwell had another disappointing IPL for Kings in 2016 and was bought by Delhi ahead of the 2018 season. He again had a poor season, scoring 142 runs at an average of 14 and not passing 50 once.

In the 2020 IPL auction, Maxwell was the subject of a bidding war between Delhi Capitals and Punjab Kings, before being bought by Kings as the second most expensive buy at IPL auctions 2020.

In 2021, Maxwell was bought by Royal Challengers Bangalore after another bidding war, this time with the Chennai Super Kings. He finished the season as the team's highest scorer, with 513 runs. He was retained by them for the 2022 IPL season as well.

Other leagues
Maxwell played for Hampshire in the 2012 Champions League Twenty20 in South Africa. In April 2022, he was bought by the London Spirit for the 2022 season of The Hundred.

Personal life

Maxwell was indirectly accused by Al Jazeera's documentary (without mentioning his name) as a chief suspect in the possible match fixing allegations during the 3rd Test match held between India and Australia which happened at Ranchi, a match where Glenn Maxwell recorded his maiden test century. However Maxwell denied all of the allegations levelled against him.

In October 2019 Maxwell announced he would be taking a break from cricket due to mental health issues. Virat Kohli praised Maxwell, saying he had set the right example.

Maxwell married his long-time girlfriend Vini Raman in March 2022.

See also
 List of centuries in Twenty20 International cricket

References

External links

 

1988 births
Living people
Australia One Day International cricketers
Australia Test cricketers
Australia Twenty20 International cricketers
Australian cricketers
Cricketers at the 2015 Cricket World Cup
Cricketers at the 2019 Cricket World Cup
Cricketers from Melbourne
Delhi Capitals cricketers
Hampshire cricketers
Punjab Kings cricketers
Melbourne Renegades cricketers
Melbourne Stars cricketers
Mumbai Indians cricketers
Surrey cricketers
Victoria cricketers
Yorkshire cricketers
Royal Challengers Bangalore cricketers
London Spirit cricketers
People from Kew, Victoria